Urtica thunbergiana, also known as the Japanese nettle or hairy nettle, is a species of perennial herbs in the family Urticaceae. It is found in Japan, China and Taiwan. The habitat of the species is moist forests in the mountains. It is in flower from July to September, and its seeds ripen from August to October. The larvae of Vanessa indica, a species of butterfly, are known to feed on U. thunbergiana.

U. thunbergiana has a Chinese name commonly used in Taiwan--yǎorénmao (Traditional Chinese: 咬人貓; literally: "biting cat")--and another name commonly used in mainland China--yǎorénxúnmá (Simplified Chinese: 咬人荨麻; literally: "biting nettle"). The official name of U. thunbergiana in Taiwan is 荨麻/xúnmá, and the official name in mainland China is 咬人荨麻/yǎorén xúnmá. The 咬人貓/biting cat is not only a common name in Taiwan, but also a commonly used name in mainland China, according to online information. 刺草/Stinging herbs is also commonly known in China. The origin of the common name 咬人貓/biting cat is just like Dendrocnide meyeniana'''s common name in Chinese 咬人狗 (yǎo rén gǒu, biting-people-dog), because the stinging hairs on the plant can cause people's skin pain, redness, burning or itching. Usually, the stinging sensation lasts for about 2 to 4 hours, and some people even feel the pain for 1 to 2 days, depending on the individual's constitution.

Like some other species in Urtica, the 咬人貓/biting cat can also be used as an ingredient, because boiling water can destroy its toxicity. In Taiwan, in addition to flavored soup, it is also made into flavored bread, Chinese shortbread or crispy fried leaves.

From 2016 to 2017, Shei-Pa National Park's headquarters commissioned a survey of animals along the Mount Dabajian hiking trail. In this investigation, a video of a Taiwan serow feeding on a 咬人貓/biting cat'' was recorded.

References

External links
Urtica thunbergiana – Plants For A Future database
Urtica thunbergiana – Flora of China @ efloras.org
Flowers of European urtica

thunbergiana
Flora of China
Flora of Taiwan
Flora of Japan